Ambulyx substrigilis, the dark-based gliding hawkmoth, is a species of moth of the family Sphingidae. It was described by John O. Westwood in 1847.

Distribution 
It is known from Sri Lanka, India, Nepal, Bangladesh, the Andaman Islands, the Nicobar Islands, Thailand, Vietnam, China (Hainan Island), Malaysia (Peninsular, Sarawak), Indonesia (Sumatra, Kalimantan) and the Philippines.

Description 
The wingspan is 96–120 mm. It can be distinguished from other Ambulyx species by the large black or tawny basal patch of the hindwing upperside. The dorsal line of the abdomen is distinct. The costal sub-basal spot on the forewing upperside is usually absent, but sometimes nearly as large as the one behind the cell.

Biology 
The larvae have been recorded feeding on Aglaia littoralis in India.

Subspecies
Ambulyx substrigilis substrigilis (Sri Lanka, India, Nepal, Bangladesh, Andaman and Nicobar Islands, Thailand, Vietnam, China (Hainan Island), Malaysia (Peninsular, Sarawak), Indonesia (Sumatra, Kalimantan), Philippines)
Ambulyx substrigilis aglaia (Jordan, 1923) (India)

In The Fauna of British India, Including Ceylon and Burma: Moths Volume I, the species is described as follows:

References

Ambulyx
Moths described in 1847
Moths of Asia